Cyril Nichols is a Democratic member of the Illinois House of Representatives from the 32nd district since April 8, 2021.

Nichols was appointed on April 8, 2021, to fill the seat of former state Representative Andre Thapedi after Thapedi resigned on March 17, 2021.

Early life, education, and career
Nichols is the associate athletics director for City Colleges of Chicago.

As of July 3, 2022, Representative Nichols is a member of the following Illinois House committees:

 Elementary & Secondary Education: Administration, Licensing & Charter Schools (HELO)
 Transportation: Regulation, Roads & Bridges (HTRR)

External links
Representative Cyril Nichols (D) at the Illinois General Assembly website

References

21st-century American politicians
African-American state legislators in Illinois
Living people
Democratic Party members of the Illinois House of Representatives
Year of birth missing (living people)
21st-century African-American politicians